This article is intended to show a timeline of the history of Glasgow, Scotland, up to the present day.

500–1099
543: The 12th century Bishop Jocelyn will later claim Glasgow's monastic church was founded by Saint Kentigern, also known as Saint Mungo, in this year; he also claimed that Kentigern found at Glasgow a cemetery which Saint Ninian had hallowed
560: Jocelyn claims Mungo/Kentigern made his first bishop in this year

1100–1199
1114: Glasgow is a farming village, with a monastic church and water mill; the reach of Glasgow's bishops extends to Cumbria; the church is elevated to temporary cathedral status by young David of Strathclyde, later David I
1118: Building of a new cathedral begins
1134: The churches of Saint John and the Holy Sepulchre are in the city; the church of Saint James is dedicated
1136: The cathedral is consecrated in the presence of David I
c1150: The Glasgow Fair is an eight-day event
1153: The sacking of Glasgow, and devastation of its surrounding countryside, by Somerled, Lord of Argyll.
c1175/c1178: William the Lion makes Glasgow an episcopal burgh of barony, and grants Bishop Jocelyn a charter
1179?-1199?: Bishop gives abbot and convent of Melrose a plot of land in Glasgow
1199: Death of Bishop Jocelyn

1200–1299
1220s: Early trades in the town include fishermen, millers, bakers, cobblers, painters, and blacksmiths; wooden merchant's houses replace peasant huts
1240: Diocesan authorities deeply in debt to bankers from Florence; church over Saint Kentigern's grave being added
1246: Dominican order (Blackfriars) establish a church.
1258: Work on Kentigern's church complete
1274: Diocese includes Teviotdale in Dumfries
1286: Glasgow Bridge, made of timber, spans the River Clyde
1293: Saint Mary's church is in the town
1295: Saint Enoch's church is also in the town, and there is a second water mill beside the Gallowgate

1300–1399
1301: Edward I of England visits Saint Kentigern's tomb in the town. Edward forces the townspeople to make a giant wooden siege tower and supply 30 wagons to transport it to Bothwell Castle to besiege it, along with tools, iron and coal; the town has trade in salmon and herring
1320: There is a St Thomas's Church in the town, with a Florentine Dean
c1330-1350: The west end of the cathedral is completed
1350: The Black Death hits the town
1380-1381: The Black Death hits Glasgow again

1400–1499
c1400: Population estimate: 1,500-2,000
1410: The wooden bridge across the River Clyde is replaced by an arched stone bridge.
1431: William Elphinstone is born. He later obtained a papal bull for the University of Aberdeen in 1495, and was involved with the introduction of printing to Scotland in 1507
1450: Glasgow is a "burgh of regality"
1451: the University of Glasgow is established by bull of Pope Nicholas V, and founded by Bishop Turnbull, beside Blackfriars monastery
1453: John Stewart, Glasgow's first Provost, appointed
1460: There is a grammar school in the city;
1464: St Nicholas Hospital founded in the city
1471: Provands Lordship, Glasgow's oldest dwelling-house, is built
1475: The Greyfriars (Franciscans) are granted a tenement and lands on the High Street; St Ninian's Hospital is established
1478: Other stone houses are built in Glasgow
1492: Pope Innocent VIII makes the See of Glasgow an Archbishopric – Robert Blackadder is the city's first archbishop

1500–1599
c1500: Population estimate is 2,500 – 3,000
1504: Plague hits Glasgow; the city is eleventh among Scottish burghs for taxation revenue
c1510: The Bishop's Palace is extended
1516-1559: The city's craft guilds are incorporated
1518: The university becomes more active
1520: The archdiocese now includes the former diocese of Argyll
1525: James Houston founds the Tron Church
1535-1556: Glasgow pays 1.5% – 3% of total Scottish burgh taxes
1544: Siege of castle; estimated population is 3,000
1556: Estimated population c4,500. Brewing recorded at site that will later become Wellpark Brewery
1560: The burgh of Glasgow is now represented in the Parliament of Scotland
1570: Andrew Melville rejuvenates the university
1574: Plague hits the city again
c1576: The council mill is rebuilt
1579: The city's cathedral is saved from demolition by craftsmen threatening to riot
1581: Glasgow pays 66% of upper Clyde customs tax
1584: Plague
1589: Golf is played on Glasgow Green
1593: Emergence of the Presbytery of Glasgow in the new self-governing church
1594: Glasgow is now fifth in ranking of Scottish burghs, paying 4.5% of export customs

1600–1699
1600: Population estimates for the city vary between 5000 and 7500
1604: 361 craftsmen work in fourteen trades, including two surgeons and 213 merchants
1605: The Trades House and Merchants House combine to form the first town council
1610: The General Assembly approves the restoration of diocesan episcopacy in Scotland
1611: Glasgow becomes a royal burgh, with a population of about 7600
1615: The Jesuit John Ogilvy is hanged for saying Mass
1621: Glasgow pays 3%-10% of Scottish customs duties
1625: The first quay is built at Broomielaw
1626: The Tolbooth is constructed
1636: There are 120 students at the university
1638: Covenanters at the General Assembly plan to abolish bishops
1639: Glasgow the 3rd richest burgh in Scotland, one-fifth as rich as Edinburgh; Hutcheson's Hospital is founded
1641: Hutchesons' Grammar School is founded for orphan boys; 50 buildings erected in Trongate
1645: Montrose enters city, celebrates victories
1645-1646: Plague hits city
1649: Glasgow displaces Perth as Scotland's 4th trading centre; pays 6.5% of customs duties
1650: Oliver Cromwell enters Glasgow while on a campaign against the Scottish Army
1652: Major fire makes about a thousand families homeless; an early fire engine from Edinburgh helps put out the blaze
1655: Glasgow trades in coal, hoops, meal, oats, butter, herring, salt, paper, prunes, timber, and hides: goat, kid, and deerskins
1656: Glasgow is described as a "flourishing city", with "strong stone walls"
1659-1665: Bridgegate merchants' house is rebuilt
1660: A coal pit is reported in the Gorbals
1661: Several pits reported
1662: A post office opens
1663: Alexander Burnet is appointed archbishop
1668: Land is purchased for a new harbour – later Port Glasgow
1669: Burnet resigns the archbishopric, objects to Act of Supremacy
1670: Glasgow displaces Aberdeen and Dundee to become Scotland's second trade city
1673: Colonel Walter Whiteford opens city's first coffee house
1675: Magistrates take action against unauthorised prayer meetings
1677: Another major fire hits the city, destroying 130 shops and houses
1678: First stagecoaches run to Edinburgh
1680: The city's population is perhaps around 12,000, with 450 traders, 100 trading overseas
1688: Broomielaw Quay is reconstructed following dredging of the River Clyde
1690 Glasgow is re-chartered as a royal burgh; the city has an early Bank of Scotland branch

1700–1799
1702: the University of Glasgow has around 400 students
1706: Anti-unionists riot; Glasgow is a major smuggling port
1707: Act of Union
1710: The city's population is estimated to be 13,000; over 200 shops are open; much of the city is liable to flooding
1712: Glasgow owners own 4% of Scottish fleet, 46 vessels
1715: Glasgow Courant newspaper first published
1718: Possible date for first Glasgow vessel to sail to America
1719: Cotton printing has begun
1720: Glasgow's estimated population is 15,000
1721-1735: James Anderson builds "Andersontown" (modern-day Anderston) village
1725: Glasgow occupied by General Wade's army; protests and street violence against liquor tax
1726: Daniel Defoe describes Glasgow as "The cleanest and best-built city in Britain"; 50 ships a year sail to America
1729: The Glasgow Journal newspaper is published
1730: The Glasgow Linen Society is formed
1735: The city's ship-owners own 67 ships
1736: The first history of Glasgow is published by John McUre
1737-1760: A new Town Hall is built west of the Tolbooth
1738: The Anderston Weavers' Society is formed
1740: Approximately 685,000 m of linen is made in Glasgow, some of which is sent to London. Hugh and Robert Tennent take over the Drygate Brewery
1740-1741: The Foulis brothers begin printing
1742: Delft pottery is manufactured in the city
1743: The Foulis brothers become printers to the university
1745: Charles Edward Stuart (Bonnie Prince Charlie) enters the city with his army; Tennents open a new brewery in Glasgow
1749: A stage coach service opens between Edinburgh and Glasgow
1750: There are five sugar refineries in the city
1751: The John Smith bookshop is established
1753: Foulis Academy is established at the university to promote art and design; turnpiking of main roads from Glasgow; the city's involvement in the tobacco trade is reflected in the naming of Virginia Street
1755: The estimated population of Glasgow is 23,500
1757: 2.2 million metres of linen are produced in the city
1760: Glasgow enjoys a wave of prosperity; there are 13 professors at Glasgow University
1762: Joseph Black discovers latent heat
1763: David Dale opens a draper's shop in the city; regular coaches run from Glasgow to Greenock
1769: Tennents brewers is now a large industry; James Watt patents his steam engine condenser
1771: The Scottish economy is boosted by trade through Glasgow
1775: Trade with America in tobacco, sugar, and cotton – the city's prosperity is at its height
1776: Adam Smith, a professor at Glasgow University, publishes Wealth of Nations
1779: Mobs protest against the Catholic Relief Act
1780: The estimated population of Glasgow is 42,000; the construction of the Forth and Clyde Canal is completed
1781: Vessels of over 30 tons can now reach Broomielaw Quay
1782-1783: The Forth and Clyde Canal enables grain from London to ease famine in Glasgow
1783: Glasgow Chamber of Commerce is founded, it is the first in Britain
1785: A hot air balloonist flies from Glasgow to Hawick in the Borders; the firm of Thomsons is formed as bankers
1794: Glasgow Royal Infirmary opens
1796: The Royal Technical College (which will later become The University of Strathclyde) is founded
1798: The Merchant Banking Company of Glasgow fails
1799: Demonstrations over bread prices; trade in tobacco and rum declines

1800–1899
1800: The River Clyde is 14 ft (3.1m) deep, and supports 200 wharves and jetties; there is a large Gaelic community in the city
1800: The Glasgow Police Act is passed by Parliament allowing the creation of the first modern preventative police force
1803: Dorothy Wordsworth visits Glasgow
1807: Hunterian Museum and Art Gallery opens off the high street, adjacent to the then campus of Glasgow University
1809: General Association of Operative Weavers is formed
1810-1814: Glasgow Asylum for Lunatics is built in Dobbies Loan
1813: Weavers fail in bid for fair wages
1814: Glasgow Green is Europe's first public park
1815: The Glasgow Herald is published twice-weekly
1817: Royal Botanic Institution of Glasgow founded by Thomas Hopkirk and others to establish a Glasgow Botanic Garden
1818: Gas street lights begin to be used in the city
1820: "Radical War"
1825: The University of Glasgow, still located in the High Street, has over 1200 students and about 30 professors; 10 coaches run to Edinburgh daily
1827: The Argyll Arcade opens
1828: James Beaumont Neilson makes breakthrough in iron-smelting technology; a total abstinence society is formed
1832: The city benefits from increased representation under the Great Reform Bill
1835–1874: The Liberals represents Glasgow in Parliament
1836: The Forth and Clyde Canal has increased traffic in goods and passengers
1837: Violent cotton-spinners strike; the leaders are sentenced to transportation
1841: Chartist demonstration is addressed by Fergus O'Connor
1842: Opening of the Edinburgh and Glasgow Railway and Glasgow Queen Street railway station; Glasgow Botanic Gardens moves to its current location
1843: Disruption of the Church of Scotland
1844: Glasgow Stock Exchange opens
1846: Burgh boundaries are more than doubled to 
1847: Swedish opera singer, Jenny Lind, performs concerts in the city
1848: 100,000 people gather on Glasgow Green to support Chartists
1849: Queen Victoria visits the city; Buchanan Street railway station opens
1851: Glasgow becomes Scotland's largest city, overtaking Edinburgh, with a population of 329,096 over 18% of which were Irish-born Portland St suspension footbridge is built
1851–1854: Victoria Bridge is built at Stockwell Street
1857–1859: St Vincent Street Church is built by Alexander "Greek" Thomson
1859: Loch Katrine water supply is opened by Queen Victoria
1862: Dr Henry Littlejohn becomes the city's first medical officer
1865: Dr Edward William Pritchard is the last person to be publicly hanged in the city, for poisoning his wife and mother-in-law
1866: The last outbreak of Cholera in the city occurs; the City Improvement Trust clears slums and constructs new roads and buildings
1867: Queen's Park F.C. is founded
1868-1870: The University of Glasgow buildings at Gilmorehill are built to designs by George Gilbert Scott
1872: Rangers F.C. is founded; Glasgow's first tram line is established, running from St. George's Cross to Eglinton Toll
1876: Partick Thistle F.C. is founded
1877: Mitchell Library opens
1883: The Boys' Brigade is founded
1887: Celtic F.C. is founded; Glasgow Botanic Gardens management taken over by town council
1888: International Exhibition (1888)
1891: City of Glasgow Act extends city boundaries and transfers ownership of the Botanic Gardens to the Corporation
1895: First cremation in Scotland's first crematorium, at the Western Necropolis
1896: Opening of the Glasgow Subway

1900–1999
1901: Glasgow International Exhibition
1902: 25 football fans die and 587 injured in the first Ibrox disaster; magistrates attempt to prohibit young women from serving in bars
1903: Charles Rennie Mackintosh designs Miss Cranston's Willow Tearooms
1904: A fire at the North British Railway kills firefighter William Rae
1904: The Kings' and Pavilion Theatres open
1905: Theatre Royal opens
1905–1907: The Caledonian Railway extends the Central Hotel
1906–1911: New buildings for the Mitchell Library are constructed
1909: Charles Rennie Mackintosh's Glasgow School of Art opens
1911: International Exposition (Scottish Exhibition of National History, Art and Industry) at Kelvingrove; Glasgow's population is 785,000
1914: Emigration leads to 20,000 housing vacancies in Glasgow
1914: Tramcars cover wide routes around Glasgow
1919: Large strike for a 40-hour week, demonstration turns into riot known as the Battle of George Square, Sheriff of Lanarkshire requests military assistance, troops sent from elsewhere in Scotland and from England, Glasgow soldiers are confined to barracks
1921: Sinn Féiners murder policeman
1923: Grouping of virtually all British railway companies: the Caledonian and Glasgow and South Western Railways are merged into the London, Midland and Scottish Railway (LMS); and the North British into the London and North Eastern Railway (LNER)
1926: Violence during General Strike
1929: Hogmanay cinema fire causes stampede which kills 69 children in Glen Cinema; Glasgow has nearly 100 cinemas
1931: The Glasgow population peaks at 1,088,000 thus becoming Britain's 2nd biggest city; the Dental Hospital in Sauchiehall Street is built
1934: Unemployed "Hunger marchers" shunned by Ramsay MacDonald; RMS Queen Mary launched
1935: Glasgow's subway becomes electric
1936: Overcrowding exists in 29% of Glasgow's houses
1937: Citywide automatic telephone dialling becomes available
1938: Glasgow hosts Empire Exhibition, Scotland 1938 at Bellahouston Park
1939: World War II: Glasgow naval base  opens
1940: Bomb hits Merkland Street subway station, closes underground for four months
1941: Bombing raids on Clydebank, 500 killed
1944: Glasgow trams carry about 14 million passengers
1946: Glasgow naval base  closes
1949: Trolleybuses in Glasgow introduced, condemned by pedestrians as the "whispering death"
1950: Eye infirmary demolished
1951: Royal Scottish Academy of Music and Drama (RSAMD) is formed by merger
1952-1955: Union Bank of Scotland absorbed by Bank of Scotland
1955: Duke Street prison closed
1958: William Burrell dies, bequeaths Burrell Collection; Lanarkshire County Council moves its headquarters from Ingram Street to Hamilton
1960: Glasgow electric Blue Train system starts; Dame Jean Roberts is elected Glasgow's first female Lord Provost
1962: Last route of the Glasgow Corporation Tramways closes
1964: University of Strathclyde established; Beeching closes low-level (Argyle) line
1966: Buchanan Street railway station and St Enoch railway station close
1967: Celtic F.C. first British winners of European Cup; QE2 launched; trolley-buses withdrawn
1969: Last daily steamers from Bridge Wharf
1970: M8 motorway and Kingston Bridge open
1971: 66 Rangers F.C. fans die in the second Ibrox disaster; Government refuse to save Upper Clyde Shipbuilders
1972: Rangers F.C. win 1972 European Cup Winners' Cup Final.
1975: British Army tackle rubbish caused by dustmans strike; Glasgow becomes the home of Strathclyde Region's headquarters; the city sees the start of Britain's first mass-circulation daily newspaper workers' cooperative when the Scottish Daily News opens in Albion Street in May, as well as the country's first newspaper work-in when it folds after six months
1977: Glasgow Subway closes for extensive modernisation (reopening in 1980)
1978: The Rev Geoff Shaw, first Convener of Strathclyde Regional Council (and former leader of Glasgow Corporation), dies in office aged 52
1979-1980: Low level Argyle Line re-opens
1982: Roy Jenkins wins Hillhead by-election for the newly formed Social Democratic Party
1983: Burrell Collection opens; launch of the Glasgow's miles better campaign
1985: Scottish Exhibition and Conference Centre opens; Glasgow population is 734,000
1988: The Glasgow Garden Festival hosts this year's National Garden Festival and attracts 4.3 million visitors.
1989: High number of poll tax arrears; St Enoch Centre opens
1990: Named as Cultural City of Europe; McLellan Galleries re-opens; Glasgow Royal Concert Hall completed; the QE2 returns to the river Clyde to mark the 150th anniversary of the beginning of the Cunard Steam Ship Company; the world's first Robot Olympics takes place in the city
1991: Glasgow Women's Library opens
1993: Glasgow Caledonian University established; Opening of the new St Mungo's Museum, the UK's only Museum of Religion, next to the city's 13th century cathedral.
1996: Glasgow Festival of Visual Arts; opening of the Gallery of Modern Art in the former Stirling's Library; first Glasgow International Festival of Design
1996–1999: Festival of Architecture and Design
1997: Opening of new £38 million Clyde Auditorium at the Scottish Exhibition and Conference Centre
1999: Glasgow is UK City of Architecture and Design; Buchanan Galleries open; millennium celebrations; The Rt Hon Donald Dewar (MP and MSP for Glasgow Anniesland) become the first First Minister of Scotland

2000–2021
2002: Final of UEFA Champion's League held at Hampden Park. Real Madrid beat Bayer Leverkusen 2–1.
2002: 2002 Glasgow floods: 200 people evacuated from Greenfield and Shettleston, contaminated water supply affects 140,000 residents across the city.
2003: Celtic F.C. reach the 2003 UEFA Cup Final in Seville.
2004: Fifteen-year-old Scottish boy Kriss Donald is abducted, tortured and murdered by Scots-Pakistani gang in racially motivated attack.
2004: Stockline Plastics factory explosion, Nine people dead, 37 injured, 15 seriously.
2005: The city launches a bid to host the 2014 Commonwealth Games.
2006: Kelvingrove Art Gallery and Museum reopens after its three-year, £27.9million restoration.
2007: Final of UEFA Cup held at Hampden Park on 16 May; Scotland's first terrorist attack after the Lockerbie bombing fails at Glasgow Airport; Glasgow awarded 2014 Commonwealth Games
2008: Rangers F.C. reach the 2008 UEFA Cup Final in Manchester.
2010: City of Glasgow College formed by merger of Central College, Glasgow Metropolitan College and Glasgow College of Nautical Studies.
2011: Glasgow Subway modernisation works begin with refurbishment of Hillhead subway station.
2012: Rangers F.C. enters administration on 14 February. They are later voted into the Scottish Football League Third Division.
2012: Glasgow hosts the preliminary football matches of the 2012 Summer Olympics.
2013: 2013 Glasgow helicopter crash: A police helicopter crashes into the Clutha Vaults pub in central Glasgow, killing 10 and injuring 31.
2014: The Glasgow School of Art library is largely destroyed by a fire.
2014: 2014 Commonwealth Games take place in Glasgow.
2014: 2014 Glasgow bin lorry crash: A Glasgow City Council bin lorry collides with pedestrians in Queen Street; 6 people are killed and 15 injured.
2016: Rangers F.C. play their first game back in the top flight of Scottish Football after being demoted to the bottom tier four years previously due to suffering serious financial difficulties;
2016: Kelvin Hall reopens after its £35million refurbishment as an art and cultural centre.
2018: A second fire breaks out at the Glasgow School of Art which also spreads to surrounding buildings including the O2 ABC.
2018: Glasgow hosts multiple sporting events including cycling, gymnastics and aquatics as part of the 2018 European Championships.
2021: COP26, the 26th UN Climate Change Conference of the Parties, is held at Glasgow; Hampden Park hosts four matches, including two involving the Scottish national team, at the delayed UEFA Euro 2020 tournament, in front of reduced crowds due to the COVID-19 pandemic.

See also
 Glasgow
 Scotland
 History of Glasgow
 History of Scotland
 Timeline of Scottish history
 Timeline of Edinburgh history

References

Notes

Further reading
Published in the 18th century
 . (1871 reprint)
 . (1887 reprint)

Published in the 19th century
 
 1818 ed.
 1825 ed.
 
 
 
 
 
 
 
 

Published in the 20th century
 
 
 
 

 Timeline
Glasgow
Glasgow-related lists
Glasgow